Arthur Augustus Meyerhoff (September 9, 1928 – September 18, 1994) was an American petroleum geologist known for his criticisms of plate tectonics. In 1971, he collaborated with Curt Teichert to write a critique of the theory of plate tectonics, arguing that it could not be true because it would have precluded both the formation of coal and widespread glaciation. His career included positions at Standard Oil, where he worked for ten years, and at the American Association of Petroleum Geologists, where he served as publications manager. He was the son of Howard Meyerhoff, who was also a geologist.

References

20th-century American geologists
American petroleum geologists
People from Northampton, Massachusetts
1928 births
1994 deaths
Yale University alumni
Stanford University alumni
Deaths from cancer in the United States